Sunarto Rasidi (born ) is an Indonesian male weightlifter, competing in the 62 kg category and representing Indonesia at international competitions. He competed at world championships, most recently at the 2003 World Weightlifting Championships. He participated at the 2004 Summer Olympics in the 62 kg event.

Major results

References

External links
 

1975 births
Living people
Indonesian male weightlifters
Weightlifters at the 2004 Summer Olympics
Olympic weightlifters of Indonesia
Place of birth missing (living people)
20th-century Indonesian people
21st-century Indonesian people